Sukhawat Ali Khan (born 1950), son of Indian-Pakistani vocalist Ustad Salamat Ali Khan and nephew of Nazakat Ali Khan, is a classical singer  of Sham Chaurasia gharana tradition, as well as a performer of North Indian and Pakistani classical music and related folk music. He began singing and playing the harmonium at age seven and has performed around the world. He currently lives in the San Francisco Bay Area where he performs in the world-fusion ensemble Shabaz (formerly the Ali Khan Band) with his sister Riffat Salamat and her husband Richard Michos.

About his heritage and music, Sukhawat Ali Khan has said:

Sukhawat is currently playing in two music ensembles in the San Francisco Bay Area: Ji featuring Sukhawat Ali Khan (Real Tribal) and Baraka Moon.

Discography
Paar Karo - 2022 (Single with Deepak Ram) 
Laaj - 2013 (with Deepak Ram )
Taswir - 1998 (with the Ali Khan Band)
Zindagi - 2000 (with the Ali Khan Band)
Shabaz - 2001 (with Shabaz)
Shukriya - 2007 (solo and with his Shukriya ensemble)

References

External links
Shabaz
World Music Central
JI on Real Tribal Presents
Baraka Moon Biography/Discography
|ALI|KHAN Allmusic Entry
Sukhawat Ali Khan at Calabash Music
Article on Salamat Ali Khan
Video of Sukhawat Ali Khan & Gurdeep Singh performance
 Sukhawat Ali Khan On Casa Ganesh Records

Living people
Pakistani classical singers
Classical music in Pakistan
1950 births